The 2023 Tim Hortons Brier, Canada's national men's curling championship, was held from March 3 to 12 at the Budweiser Gardens in London, Ontario. The defending champion Team Canada rink, skipped by Brad Gushue won the event, and will go on to represent Canada at the 2023 World Men's Curling Championship on home soil at TD Place Arena in Ottawa, Ontario. It was a record fifth Brier title as a skip for Gushue. 

Brad Gushue and his team won the 2022 edition and entered as the reigning Team Canada. The event followed the same format at the past two editions that included Team Canada, the fourteen Canadian curling member associations and three Wild Card teams that are the top three teams that did not qualify from their provincial playdowns based on CTRS standings. The competition was held in three stages: all eighteen teams play in a round robin stage, from which six advance to the championship stage, from which four teams advance to the final playoffs round.

This was the final Brier with Tim Hortons as the primary sponsor of the event.

Summary
Prior to the event, Northern Ontario lead Colin Hodgson announced he would be retiring from team curling at the end of the season. Hodgson would cap off his career in his final game by curling a perfect game in a 7–5 loss to Wild Card 1 in the Championship round.

In Draw 2, Nunavut, skipped by Jake Higgs won its first ever game at the Brier when it defeated Newfoundland and Labrador 7–4. The territory had lost its previous 38 games since its first appearance in 2018. The win was clinched when Newfoundland skip Nathan Young missed a double takeout in the 10th end.

Following the round robin portion, both undefeated Manitoba (skipped by Matt Dunstone) and 7–1 Team Canada (Brad Gushue) earned byes in the championship round after they won their groups. Following Manitoba, Team Alberta (Kevin Koe) finished second in Group A with a 7–1 record, then Northern Ontario (Darren Moulding) in third with a 6–2 record. In Group B, Wild Card #1 (Brendan Bottcher) finished second with a 7–1 record, followed by Ontario (Mike McEwen) who finished 6–2. Bottcher finished second behind Gushue due to having lost their round robin match against them. McEwen secured the third place spot by defeating Wild Card #3 (Karsten Sturmay) on his final shot in the final draw, avoiding a tiebreaker against Quebec.

In the championship round page qualifying games, Team Ontario took on Alberta, while Wild Card #1 took on Northern Ontario. In the Ontario–Alberta game, Ontario did not lead the game until McEwen's last shot, a double-takeout for two, to win the game 9–8. In the other game, Team Wild Card #1 dominated Northern Ontario to win 8–5. The games eliminated both Alberta and Northern Ontario, and put Ontario and Wild Card #1 into the page seeding round against Team Canada and Manitoba respectively. 

In the page seeding games, Manitoba defeated Wild Card #1 thanks to a final shot "pistol" though a port by Matt Dunstone, to win 5–3. In the other game, the Brad Gushue-led Team Canada squad easily defeated the hometown Ontario team 9–3. With their wins, Manitoba and Canada will go to the 1 vs. 2 page playoff game, while Wild Card #1 and Ontario played each other in the 3 vs. 4 game.

In the 3 vs. 4 game, Team Wild Card #1 (Bottcher) controlled most of the game against Ontario (McEwen). The Bottcher rink got the game's only deuce in the sixth after McEwen ticked a guard and missed a double takeout, taking a 4–2 lead. McEwen also missed a runback in the ninth, leading to a steal for the Wild Card entry, cementing the game for Bottcher, giving them a 6–3 win. The win put Wild Card #1 into the semifinal against the loser of the 1 vs. 2 game, which would be Manitoba's Dunstone rink. The game would be the last of the season for Team McEwen, as they did not qualify for the remaining Grand Slams.

In the 1 vs. 2 game, Team Canada (Gushue) took on the undefeated Manitoba rink, skipped by Matt Dunstone. The teams exchanged deuces with Manitoba scoring two in the third, and Canada scoring two in the fourth. With the teams tied at four each after six, Dunstone blanked the next three ends to retain the hammer in the final end. On his final shot of the 10th, Dunstone had to make a perfect hit and stick on his own rock for the win, but the stone rolled a half-rock away instead, giving up a steal of one to Canada, and the game. With the win, Canada's Gushue rink earned a bye to the final, while Manitoba was forced to play in the semifinal against Wild Card #1.

In the semifinal, Manitoba rebounded from their loss the previous evening by defeating Wild Card #1's Brendan Bottcher 7–5. Tied 5–5 in the 10th end, and without the hammer, Dunstone came around two stones to sit shot on the side of the button on his last stone. Bottcher responded by coming up short on his draw attempt, giving up a steal of two. The win sent Manitoba into the final, and the Bottcher rink home with bronze medals.

The 2023 Brier final was a rematch of the 1 vs. 2 game between Team Canada's Brad Gushue and Manitoba's Matt Dunstone. With the hammer, Gushue blanked the first end, but was forced to draw to take one in the second after Manitoba was sitting three. Both teams proceeded to trade forces until the eighth, including in the sixth when Dunstone made a freeze, followed by a heavy draw by Gushue. With the game tied at three apiece, Gushue took a commanding lead by scoring three in the eighth, to take a 6–3 lead, the first multiple score in the game up to that point. Manitoba struggled in the end, with second Colton Lott flashing, and third B. J. Neufeld rubbing a stone on a freeze attempt. Dunstone himself had to make a hit and roll, but wasn't perfect enough, allowing Gushue a hit for three. Dunstone rebounded by scoring two in the ninth, to head into the last end down by one, without the hammer. On his last rock in the 10th, Dunstone made a tap to lie two. Gushue responded by drawing to the four-foot against to claim his career fifth Brier title in seven years, a record for skips. In total, there were 6,562 spectators on hand for the final. 

With the win, Team Gushue took home $108,000, with Dunstone taking home $60,000 and Bottcher $40,000.

Teams
The fourteen Canadian curling member associations held playdowns to determine who would represent their province or territory. Team Canada is represented by Team Brad Gushue, who were the winners of the 2022 Tim Hortons Brier. The three wild card teams were decided by the CTRS standings. The top three teams who did not already qualify from their playdowns, qualified.

CTRS ranking
As of February 13, 2023
Source:

Wild card selection
Curling Canada included three wild card teams, continuing a process started with the 2021 Brier. The teamsskipped by Brendan Bottcher (Alberta), Reid Carruthers (Manitoba) and Karsten Sturmay (Alberta)were the top three in the Canadian Team Ranking System standings who had not otherwise qualified by winning their provincial championship nor by being the reigning Team Canada champion.

Round robin standings
Final Round Robin Standings

Round robin results

All draw times are listed in Eastern Time (UTC−05:00).

Draw 1
Friday, March 3, 7:00 pm

Draw 2
Saturday, March 4, 2:00 pm

Draw 3
Saturday, March 4, 7:00 pm

Draw 4
Sunday, March 5, 9:00 am

Draw 5
Sunday, March 5, 2:00 pm

Draw 6
Sunday, March 5, 7:00 pm

Draw 7
Monday, March 6, 9:00 am

Draw 8
Monday, March 6, 2:00 pm

Draw 9
Monday, March 6, 7:00 pm

Draw 10
Tuesday, March 7, 9:00 am

Draw 11
Tuesday, March 7, 2:00 pm

Draw 12
Tuesday, March 7, 7:00 pm

Draw 13
Wednesday, March 8, 9:00 am

Draw 14
Wednesday, March 8, 2:00 pm

Draw 15
Wednesday, March 8, 7:00 pm

Draw 16
Thursday, March 9, 9:00 am

Draw 17
Thursday, March 9, 2:00 pm

Draw 18
Thursday, March 9, 7:00 pm

Championship round

Semifinals
Friday, March 10, 1:00 pm

Finals
Friday, March 10, 7:00 pm

Playoffs

1 vs. 2
Saturday, March 11, 7:00 pm

3 vs. 4
Saturday, March 11, 1:00 pm

Semifinal
Sunday, March 12, 12:00 pm

Final
Sunday, March 12, 7:00 pm

Statistics

Top 5 player percentages
Final Round Robin Percentages; minimum 6 games

Perfect games
Round robin and championship round only; minimum 10 shots thrown

Awards
The awards and all-star teams are listed as follows:

All-Star Teams

Ross Harstone Sportsmanship Award
The Ross Harstone Sportsmanship Award is presented to the player chosen by their fellow peers as the curler who best represented Harstone's high ideals of good sportsmanship, observance of the rules, exemplary conduct and curling ability.

Curling Canada Award of Achievement
Scott Higgins, TSN

Hec Gervais Most Valuable Player Award
 Brad Gushue, skip, Team Canada

Provincial and territorial playdowns

 2023 Boston Pizza Cup (Alberta): February 8–12
 2023 BC Men's Curling Championship: January 11–15
 2023 Viterra Championship (Manitoba): February 8–12
 2023 New Brunswick Tankard: February 8–12
 2023 Newfoundland and Labrador Tankard: January 25–29
 2023 Northern Ontario Men's Provincial Curling Championship: January 25–29
 2023 Northwest Territories Men's Curling Championship: February 1–6
 2023 Nova Scotia Tankard: January 25–30
 2023 Nunavut Brier Playdowns: December 16–18
 2023 Ontario Tankard: January 24–29
 2023 PEI Tankard: January 25–29
 2023 Quebec Tankard: January 8–15
 2023 SaskTel Tankard (Saskatchewan): February 1–5
 2023 Yukon Men's Curling Championship: Were held January 13–16. Three teams entered: Team Scoffin (Thomas Scoffin, Trygg Jensen, Joe Wallingham, Evan Latos), Team Komlodi (Andrew Komlodi, Terry Miller, Peter Andersen, Doug Hamilton) and Team Mikkelsen (Dustin Mikkelsen, Alexander Peech, Brandon Hagen, Jamie Steeves and Rob Andison) Scoffin defeated Komlodi in the final, 6–4.

Notes

References

External links

 
Brier
Curling in Ontario

Brier
Sports competitions in London, Ontario
The Brier